AD 2 (2 CE) was a common year of the Julian calendar.

AD 2 may also refer to:
Ad 2, a division of the American Advertising Federation
, a US Navy destroyer tender
AD-2 Skyraider, an American attack aircraft